Lenne Hardt (born May 10, 1963) is an American voice actress and ring announcer for Japanese mixed martial arts organizations. Her resume includes PRIDE Fighting Championships, DREAM, ONE Championship and Glory World Series and she currently works in Rizin Fighting Federation. She is also the official announcer for Japanese idol group Momoiro Clover Z, and was the official athlete announcer for the, 2022 ADCC World Championship hosted by Seth Daniels from F2W

Biography
Hardt was the youngest of six children and an Air Force brat. Although she was born in Alaska she spent much of her childhood in Idaho. Hardt and her siblings were home-schooled. At the age of 17, Hardt lived in Japan for a year with her brother and sister-in-law, who were already long-time residents of the country. Hardt returned to the U.S. and attended New York University to study the Japanese language and arts before permanently moving to Japan in 1988.  While in Tokyo she met her future-husband, a New Zealander. In addition to working as a disc jockey and announcer for television and radio, she has worked as a voice actress for the English dubs of Japanese anime and video games. She also performs as a theater actor and comedian.

Ring announcing
Hardt entered into a career as an English language announcer for mixed martial arts events in 2000 at PRIDE's first Grand Prix. PRIDE officials needed an announcer fluent in English and Japanese. Although she had no experience with the sport, her agent contacted her about the job and she took it simply because it fit into her schedule. Hardt became a self-described fan of the sport and continued as the English announcer for PRIDE until its final event. When the former staff of PRIDE created DREAM, Hardt was carried over as well. Hardt has also worked with Japanese pro wrestling organization New Japan Pro-Wrestling as a special guest English language ring announcer for their January 4 Tokyo Dome shows, announcing both Wrestle Kingdom 8 in 2014 and Wrestle Kingdom 9 in 2015.

Hardt's energetic style, which usually includes high-pitched screeching and long alveolar trills, has earned her notoriety within the promotion. Fans have dubbed her "Crazy PRIDE Lady" and many fighters admit to getting "pumped up" by her introductions. She uses singing techniques to prevent damage to her throat rather than take measures to mitigate the damage.

In 2022, Hardt was the announcer for the ADCC Worlds No-Gi grappling championship and performed the ceremonial fighters' presentation.

Filmography

Anime roles
BeyWheelz - Ring Announcer
Hayate the Combat Butler - MC (ep. 28)
Idaten Jump
Kinnikuman Nisei: Ultimate Muscle II - Herself (ep. 9)
Kirarin Revolution
Mobile Suit Gundam Unicorn - Operator (ep. 1)
Ring ni Kakero 1 - Ring Call

Television Drama roles
Kikai Sentai Zenkaiger - Zenkaiger Equipment Voice

Video game roles

Air Gallet - Narrator
Confidential Mission
Countdown Vampires - Jane Dark, Three Witches, Additional Voices
EA Sports MMA - Herself
FantaVision - Announcer
Futari no Fantavision - Announcer
Kinnikuman Muscle Grand Prix Series - Announcer
Kinnikuman Muscle Generations - Announcer
Octomania - Angelique, Fei Fei
Phantasy Star Nova - System Voice
Pride Fighting Championships - Herself
Space Griffon VF-9 - Maria Hansfield
The Transformers - Arcee
UFC Undisputed 3 - Herself (PRIDE mode)
Yakuza 0 - Coliseum Announcer
Tekken 8 - System Voice

References

External links

Aoni Production page
Lenne's Webpage page

1963 births
20th-century American actresses
21st-century American actresses
Actresses from Alaska
American expatriates in Japan
American video game actresses
American voice actresses
Dream (mixed martial arts)
Living people
Mixed martial arts announcers
Place of birth missing (living people)
Pride Fighting Championships